Teodora is a feminine given name, a variation of the name Theodora. 

Notable people with the name include:
Teodora Sava (born 2001), Romanian singer
Teodora Albon (born 1977), Romanian football referee
Teodora Ginés, (1530–1598), Dominican musician and composer
Teodora Matejko (born 1846), The wife of Polish painter Jan Matejko
Teodora Ungureanu (born 1960), Romanian gymnast
Teodora Ruano (born 1969), Spanish cyclist 
Teodora Alexandrova (born 1981), Individual Rhythmic Gymnast
Teodora Kolarova (born 1981), Bulgarian middle distance runner
Teodora Malcheva (born 1983), Bulgarian cross country skier
Teodora Poštič (born 1984), Slovenian figure skater
Teodora Andreeva (born 1987), Bulgarian pop-folk singer
Teodora Mirčić (born 1988), Serbian tennis player
Teodora Pušić (born 1993), Serbian volleyball player
Teodora Džehverović (born 1997), Serbian singer

See also
Theodora (disambiguation)
Doña Teodora Alonzo High School in Manila, Philippines
St. Teodora de la Sihla Church, cathedral in Central Chişinău, Moldova

Bulgarian feminine given names
Romanian feminine given names
Serbian feminine given names